María Vanessa Álava Moreira is an Ecuadorian politician who was elected to Ecuador's National Assembly for the .

Life 
Álava was born in 1982 and she was brought up in El Carmen Canton. She studied at the Technical University of Manabí and she gained a Master in Business Administration at the Agrarian University of Ecuador.

She worked as a bank clerk in 2010 and 2013 at the National Development Bank.

She was elected to the National Assembly to represent the province of Manabi in 2021. Her substitute is Coppiano Arguello Yalina Mishell. She is one of the Assembly's members who sit on the "Permanent Commission on Biodiversity and Natural Resources".

In November 2021, she was one of the eighty-one members of the Assembly who did not vote for the Economic Reform Bill which would have brought in changes to the tax system.

In April 2022 she proposed a law relating to personal finance. The change would require full disclosure of information and it would allow for refinancing.

In June 2022 she was among the members who requested a debate concerning the replacement of President Guillermo Lasso. Forty-six other members signed the request including Sofía Espín, Jhajaira Urresta, Patricia Mendoza, Victoria Desintonio, Viviana Veloz and Rosa Mayorga.

References 

Living people
21st-century Ecuadorian women politicians
21st-century Ecuadorian politicians
20th-century Ecuadorian women
1982 births
Women members of the National Assembly (Ecuador)
Members of the National Assembly (Ecuador)
People from Manabí Province